Philippe Henriot (7 January 1889 – 28 June 1944) was a French poet, journalist, politician, and minister in the French government at Vichy, where he directed propaganda broadcasts. He also joined the Milice part-time.

Career
Philippe Henriot, a devout Roman Catholic, and poet who had written several books of poetry during the early 1920s, became politically active during the Republican Federation, and was elected to the Third Republic's Chamber of Deputies for the Gironde department in 1932 and 1936. He became "a committed member of the Catholic nationalist right". By the mid-1930s his anti-republican prejudices made him a natural opponent of the Popular Front and his speeches showed him to be an anti-communist, anti-Semite, Anti-Freemasonry, and against the parliamentary system. In 1936 General de Castelnau, the aristocratic leader of the National Catholic Federation, described Henriot as "an ardent defender of religion, the family and society." At the beginning of World War II, he was strongly anti-German. However, in 1941 Henriot began to support Nazi Germany after it invaded the Soviet Union in Operation Barbarossa, as he hoped for the defeat of Communism, believing that Bolshevism was the enemy of Christianity.

Propagandist
In 1940, after the surrender of France to Germany, Henriot became active as a journalist working for the French government headed by Philippe Pétain which had removed to Vichy. In December 1943 he was appointed Secretary of State for Information. During his career he created programs and broadcast through Radio Paris, becoming the government's spokesman. He developed a war of propaganda against the Free French Forces and the BBC; whose spokesmen were Pierre Dac and Maurice Schumann. Seeking to shape the perceptions of the French government and German occupation, and to destroy popular support for the Résistance, Henriot was given the nickname of the "French Goebbels". He broadcast twice daily on Radio-Vichy, "repeatedly and eloquently attacking all those he considered lukewarm in their attitude to collaboration and calling on all good Catholics to support the German cause in the fight against communism." He continued the propaganda programmes after the Germans were forced, due to the new Allied presence in North Africa, to extend their military occupation in 1942 over Southern France, formerly the Free Zone controlled by the French government at Vichy. He warned the French people about any association with the Allies or "terrorists" (resistance groups) and countered the arguments of the Free French Forces broadcasting from the BBC. He wrote and delivered 270 broadcasts on Radio Vichy in a "mesmerising rhetoric and delivery" ... as a "huge media star", according to one source. "There is no doubt Henriot's broadcasts were influential, attracting a large and diverse audience." 

It was said that "Henriot is listened to by everyone, enemies or supporters. Families shift their meal times so as not to miss him. There is no-one left in the street at the time he speaks." On 6 January 1944, Henriot was appointed as the French Minister of Information and Propaganda.

In 1943, Henriot joined the paramilitary Milice "with a deep-seated conviction that Christian civilisation was engaged in a life and death struggle against Bolshevism."

Assassination
Henriot was a natural target for the Résistance, and on 28 June 1944, in the Ministry building where he lived, he was assassinated by a group of COMAC members of the Maquis, an organisation designated by the French government at Vichy as "terrorists". Disguised as members of the Milice, they had persuaded him to open his door. In retaliation, the Milice assassinated Georges Mandel, a strong opponent of collaboration. Henriot was afforded a state funeral in Paris, presided over by Cardinal Suhard in Notre Dame Cathedral. His coffin was placed, surrounded by French flags and flowers, in front of the Hôtel de Ville, where thousands filed past to mourn him – less than two months before the Liberation of Paris.

References

External links
 Website Philippe Henriot
 BBC History Magazine's Podcast (July 2010)
 

1889 births
1944 deaths
Writers from Reims
Politicians from Reims
Republican Federation politicians
Members of the 15th Chamber of Deputies of the French Third Republic
Members of the 16th Chamber of Deputies of the French Third Republic
People of Vichy France
French fascists
French propagandists
French anti-communists
French male non-fiction writers
French collaborators with Nazi Germany
Assassinated French politicians
People murdered in Paris
Christian fascists
20th-century French journalists
20th-century French male writers
1944 murders in France
1940s murders in Paris